JFS (formerly known as the Jews' Free School and later Jewish Free School) is a Jewish mixed comprehensive school in Kenton, North London, England and was founded in 1732. Amongst its early supporters was the writer and philanthropist Charlotte Montefiore. At one time it was the largest Jewish school in the world, with more than 4,000 pupils.

Staff

Head teachers

Other staff
Poet Daljit Nagra taught English at the school, as well as having other support staff roles including Learning Resource Centre staff member
Michael Adler taught Hebrew at the school in the late-19th century

Houses and other traditions
JFS operates the house system and has four houses for organisational purposes. Students must wear a tie with stripes in their house colour.

Both Brodetsky and Zangwill were former students, Angel was a previous and long-serving headmaster and Weizmann, who has several links to the school, was the first President of the State of Israel.

Students are split into their respective houses for most classes in Years 7, 8 and 9 as well as inter-house competitions, such as football and basketball.

A tradition called "muck-up day" involves Year 11 students celebrating the last day of formal schooling before their GCSE examinations with various pranks. In May 2015 this descended into "a near-riot", with more than 300 pupils barred from the campus after a small minority spread foam, eggs, flour and dead chickens around the school. The police were called after some students broke through a security fence and let off fireworks, but no arrests were made.

Transport and location

The school moved from Camden Town to a new site in Kenton in 2002 to represent the demand of London's Jewish population moving further out towards the suburbs. The school is within the jurisdiction of the London Borough of Brent, while its postal town is Harrow.

There are special bus routes, provided by Transport for London (TfL), between the school and several areas with a large Jewish population, such as Edgware, Mill Hill, Southgate, Barnet, Hendon, Muswell Hill,  Radlett, Bushey and  Elstree. The nearest train station is Kingsbury (Jubilee line), which is a few minutes' walk away. Preston Road (Metropolitan line) is also nearby.

The list of bus routes are as follows: 653, 683, 688, 628 and B77.

Academic results
In 2007, with 53% of the school's attempted GCSE exams receiving grades of A* or A. In 2012 JFS was at the top of the School League Tables for GCSE in Brent and its A-Level results were the best of all the mainstream Jewish schools.

Awards
The school won a Wellbeing at School Award in 2021.

Controversy over admissions criteria

In October 2006, a Jewish father made enquiries with the United Synagogue as to whether his son, born to a mother who had been converted to Judaism under the auspices of the Masorti (Conservative) denomination, could convert under Orthodox auspices for entry to JFS in September 2007. He was advised the process could take several years and that such applications to JFS are very rarely successful given that the school is highly oversubscribed. He applied for his son but did not declare to the school's admissions board the mother's conversion history.

By April 2007, he had not supplied JFS with the requested information, whereupon the school advised him that, being oversubscribed that year, it was unlikely his son could be offered a place. He thereupon unsuccessfully appealed for reconsideration of his application.

In July 2008, the father sought to prosecute JFS on the grounds of racial discrimination, but High Court judge, Mr Justice Munby, ruled contrariwise, holding JFS' selection criteria were not intrinsically different from Christian or Islamic faith schools and their being declared illegal could adversely affect "the admission arrangements in a very large number of faith schools of many different faiths and denominations".

The Court of Appeal, however, in June 2009 declared that JFS, under the Race Relations Act 1976, had illegally discriminated against the child on grounds of race. They ruled that the mother's religious status, and thus her child's religious status, had been determined using a racial criterion rather than a religious criterion. The school subsequently issued revised admissions criteria based on religious practice including synagogue attendance, formal Jewish education and volunteering. JFS and the United Synagogue appealed to the Supreme Court, with the support of the Chief Rabbi Jonathan Sacks. On 16 December 2009, the UK Supreme Court upheld the Court of Appeal's ruling.

Notable former pupils

Barney Barnato, Randlord
Gina Bellman, actress
Raphael Benjamin, rabbi in Australia and America
Selig Brodetsky, mathematician, Zionist leader, and President of the Hebrew University of Jerusalem
Benjamin Cohen, journalist and Channel 4 News presenter
Morris Cohen, adventurer
 Dean Furman (born 1988) - professional footballer
Maurice Glasman, academic, social thinker and Labour life peer
Samuel Gompers, first President of the American Federation of Labor
Ray Kelvin, founder of luxury clothing retail company Ted Baker

 Josh Kennet (born 1987), English-Israeli footballer
David Joseph, chairman and CEO of Universal Music UK
Bernard Lewis, founder and owner, River Island
Joe Loss, musician
Jez San, game designer, Argonaut Games
Ian Stone, comedian
Joel Samuels – DJ Luck, DJ 
Steven Reingold, cricketer
Eyal Booker, Love Island Contestant
Barbara Roche, Labour politician
Jonny Benjamin, mental health campaigner

References

Further reading
 Black, Gerry (1998). A history of the Jews' Free School, London, since 1732. Tymsder Publishing ISBN 09531  110419.

External links
 JFS official website
 OFSTED Report

1732 establishments in England
Educational institutions established in 1732
Jewish English history
Jewish schools in England
Kenton, London
Secondary schools in the London Borough of Brent
Voluntary aided schools in London
